Boisard is a surname.

People with the name include:
 Jean Boisard (died ), French numismatist
 Jean-François Boisard (–1820), French painter and poet
 Jean-Jacques Boisard (1743–1831), French fabulist
 Marcel André Boisard (born 1939), Swiss diplomat

See also 
 Boissard